The Siyi (Seiyap or Sze Yup in Cantonese) refers to the four former counties of Xinhui (Sunwui), Taishan (Toisan), Kaiping (Hoiping) and Enping (Yanping) on the west side of the Pearl River Delta in Southern Guangdong Province, China.

Geography
One of the early descriptions of the land came from the American missionary, William Speer, who lived there around 1850 and observed: "Towns embowered in bamboo, a species of banyan and other trees meet the eye on every hand. The level portion of the soil is cultivated as only the Chinese know how to do in order to obtain the utmost possible returns from Nature. The view appears like a great garden bounded by ranges of hills."

Xinhui is a city district and the other three are county-level cities, all four belong to Jiangmen Prefecture administered from the city of Jiangmen. An alternative term, Wuyi, which refers to the five former counties of Xinhui, Taishan, Kaiping and Enping as well as Heshan, all administered by Jiangmen, has become an official title and is widely accepted by the local residents today. However, among overseas Chinese, the name Siyi is still popular and frequently used as Heshan County was established much later than the other four.

It is said that over 100 famous people come from the Siyi or Wuyi region of Guangdong Province, making the region famous for producing more entertainment stars than any other region in mainland China. As a result, the local government in Jiangmen which administers the Siyi or Wuyi cities of Taishan, Kaiping, Enping, Xinhui and Heshan, decided to build a Stars Park called Jiangmen Star Park.

Dialects
The area gave rise to the Siyi dialects, the most prominent of which is Taishanese (Toisanese/Hoisanese). Although Siyi and Cantonese both belong to the Yue branch of Chinese, Cantonese speakers cannot easily understand Siyi dialect.

Emigration

In the late 19th century and early 20th century, many people from the Siyi (or Sze Yup as it was then known) emigrated to Hong Kong, Southeast Asia, Australasia, North America and South America. Of the Chinese American population from that time until the 1950s, Sze Yup accounted for the vast majority, about 80%, along with people from Sanyi (Sam Yup) and Zhongshan (Chung Shan).

In America, people from Sze Yup generally worked as laborers; Sam Yup people worked as entrepreneurs; and Chung Shan people specialized in agriculture. The Punti-Hakka Clan Wars also erupted in the Sze Yup counties just prior to this time period of emigration. In 1851, two Wui Gun (huiguan) (native place associations) were established in San Francisco: the Sze Yup Wui Gun and the Sam Yup Wui Gun. Endowed with only limited arable lands, with much of the terrain either rocky or swampy, Sze Yup was the "pre-eminent sending area" of overseas Chinese.

In addition to being a region of major emigration abroad, Sze Yup is a melting pot of ideas and trends brought back by overseas Chinese. For example, many tong lau in Chekham and diaolou in Hoiping and Toishan built in the early 20th century incorporate architectural features from both China and the West.

Notable people:
 Chen Xian Zhang: scholar of Ming dynasty
 Liang, Qi Zhao: scholar of early modern China
 Wu, Xiang Shi (吳尚時) (1904-1947): geographer 
 Gary Faye Locke: Chinese American, a politician, his ancestral hometown is Taishan City
 Joey Yung (容祖兒): female singer of Hong Kong
 Andy Lau (劉德華): male singer and actor of Hong Kong

Popular Culture
Mark Twain references the See Yup Company, and the Ning Yeong Company, in Roughing It.

See also 
Sanyi
Yue Chinese

References

External links
 See Yup Society temple in South Melbourne, Victoria

 
Historical regions